Monika Motsch (born 1942) is a German sinologist who works as a professor at the University of Bonn and University of Erlangen–Nuremberg.

Biography
Monika Motsch was born in Germany in 1942. In 1971, she earned her doctor's degree in Sinology from Heidelberg University. From 1973 to 2004, she successively worked as lecturer and professor at the University of Bonn. She was director of the Department of Sinology of the University of Erlangen–Nuremberg in 1998, and held that office until 2000. From 2012 to 2014, she was a foreign specialist of Tsinghua University. During that time, she worked with her husband Richard Motsch, Tsinghua Case Museum and Commercial Publishing House to sort out Qian Zhongshu's Foreign Language Notes.

Personal life
In 1968, she was married to Richard Motsch, who is a lawyer.

Works

Translations
 Fortress Besieged (Qian Zhongshu)
 We Three (Yang Jiang)

Awards
Jane Scatcherd Translation Award
Special Book Awards of China (2012)

References

External links
 Prof. Dr. Monka Motsch Private Homepage

1942 births
Living people
German sinologists
German translators
Chinese–German translators
Heidelberg University alumni
20th-century German women writers
21st-century German women writers
Academic staff of the University of Bonn
Academic staff of the University of Erlangen-Nuremberg